Romario Harewood (born 17 August 1994) is a Barbadian footballer who currently plays for Weymouth Wales FC of the Barbados Premier Division and the Barbados national team as a midfielder.

Club career
From 2010 to 2011, Harewood played for Barbadian club St. John's Sonnets. Since 2014, he has played for Barbados Defense Force of the Barbados Premier Division. For the 2015 season, Harewood was the Premier Division's second highest scorer with 14 goals as BDF were crowned league champions.

In December 2015 he was one of two Barbadian players (alongside Jomo Harris) to be selected for the MLS Caribbean Combine in Martinique.

In January 2017 it was announced that Harewood had signed for Weymouth Wales FC.

International career
Harewood was part of the U17 squad that participated in the 2011 CONCACAF U-17 Championship. He made his senior international debut for Barbados on 2 March 2014 in a friendly against Jamaica.

International goals

Score and result list Barbados's goal tally first.

Personal
Harewood is the son of Bernard Howell, a Barbadian goalkeeper who has also played for Saint John's Sonnets.

References

External links
 
 Barbados FA profile
 Caribbean Football Database profile
 
 

Living people
Association football midfielders
Barbados international footballers
1994 births
Barbadian footballers
Barbados Defence Force SC players
Weymouth Wales FC players